Ukrainian studies is an interdisciplinary field of research dedicated to Ukrainian language, literature, history and culture in a broad sense.

Ukrainian studies outside Ukraine 

A number of research institutes outside of Ukraine focus on Ukrainian studies. The major centers include Harvard Ukrainian Research Institute at the Harvard University, Ukrainian studies center at Columbia University, Canadian Institute of Ukrainian Studies at the University of Alberta (which publishes the Journal of Ukrainian Studies), Ukrainian Free University in Munich and Cambridge Ukrainian Studies at the University of Cambridge.

Noted scholars 
 George Shevelov
 Dmytro Chyzhevsky
 Mark von Hagen
 Taras Kuzio

See also

 Harvard Ukrainian Research Institute
 Centre for Ukrainian Canadian Studies

References

External links 
 International Association for Ukrainian Studies	
 American Association for Ukrainian Studies	
 Canadian Institute of Ukrainian Studies
 Academic Directory for Ukrainian Studies: Research Opportunities in North America 
 Information relating to Ukrainian studies at UK universities